Raja Veettu Kannukkutty is a 1984 Indian Tamil-language film, directed by C. V. Rajendran and produced by P. Ramdass and B. Ramanan. The film stars Prabhu, Viji, S. V. Shekar and V. K. Ramasamy.

Cast 

Prabhu
Viji
S. V. Shekar
V. K. Ramasamy
Y. G. Mahendran
Nizhalgal Ravi
Kathadi Ramamurthy
M. R. Krishnamurthy
Oru Viral Krishna Rao
Manorama
Anuradha
Vadivukkarasi
Lavanya
Renuka
Indiradevi

Soundtrack
Soundtrack was composed by M. S. Viswanathan & lyrics were by Vaali
"Karpanai Vaanil" - S. P. Balasubrahmanyam
"Angami Surangami" - Vani Jairam
"Summayirunthavanai Soodu Kilappi" - Malaysia Vasudevan
"Kannmani Un Thirumanam" - Vani Jairam

References

External links 

 

1984 films
Films scored by M. S. Viswanathan
1980s Tamil-language films
Films directed by C. V. Rajendran